Takano is a Japanese surname. Notable people with the surname include:

Ai Takano, Japanese singer
Aya Takano, Japanese artist and writer
Aya Takano (swimmer), Japanese athlete
Takano Chōei, scholar of the late Edo period
Takano Fusataro, Japanese labor activist
Genshin Takano (governor of Hiroshima)
George Takano, professional wrestler
Hajime Takano, Japanese journalist
Hassei Takano, Japanese actor
, Japanese shogi player
Hiroshi Takano, Japanese musician
Isoroku Takano, birth name of Isoroku Yamamoto, Japanese naval officer
Takano Iwasaburo, Japanese social statistician
Kazuaki Takano, Japanese writer of crime fiction
Kikuo Takano, Japanese poet and mathematician
Koji Takano, Japanese football player
Mari Takano, Japanese musician 
Mark Takano, U.S. politician
Takano no Niigasa, 8th-century concubine
, Japanese shogi player
Shiho Takano, Japanese actress
Shunji Takano, Japanese wrestler
Susumu Takano, Japanese track athlete
Teppei Takano, Japanese ski jumper
Tetsu Takano, Japanese rock musician
, Japanese model and boxer
Toshiyuki Takano, Japanese diplomat
Tsugi Takano, Japanese novelist 
Urara Takano, Japanese voice actress
, Japanese speed skater
, Japanese speed skater

Fictional characters
Bungo Takano, a character in Shadow Star
Kyohei Takano, a character in The Wallflower
Miyo Takano, a character in Higurashi no Naku Koro ni

See also
 Japanese name
 Special:Prefixindex/Takano – the page gives articles starting with Takano

Japanese-language surnames